Perinthos may refer to:
Perinthos, Syria, one of the cities founded by Seleukos
Perinthos, Kilkis, community near Kilkis, Greece, founded in 1928 from refugees, previously called Kavakli
Perinthus, ancient Perinthos, later called Heracleia, Samian colony in the European coast of Propontis